Christian Roger Andreu (born November 15, 1976) is a French musician best known as the lead guitarist of metal band Gojira, and was guitarist on a Familha Artús album.

Music
Christian Andreu's influences include bands such as Death, Metallica, Morbid Angel, Tool, Slayer, and classical music.

His favorite non-metal musicians are Mozart, La Tordue, Têtes Raides, and Björk, as well as Bulgarian music and Indian music. He cites French singers such as Alain Bashung, Barbara, Jacques Brel, and Georges Brassens.

In an interview for Lyon's ZYVA Magazine, Andreu explained that he does not listen to much metal music apart from Gojira, stating that he primarily listens to classical music. Andreu credited "Symbolic" from the band Death as the song that portrays him.

In 2007, he was also a guitarist in an experimental ethno-tribal progressive rock band playing in a traditional style called Familha Artús.

On May, 2019 towards the end of the song "Stranded" at Ohio's Sonic Temple Festival, the pyrotechnic effects of the show have projected flames in his face under the effect of the wind. Burned superficially, Andreu had to leave his comrades but returned on stage to complete the concert, while taking breaks between songs to throw water on his face. He recovered quickly.

Personal life 
Christian Andreu resides close to nature on the south west coast of France, near San Sebastián, Spain. He maintains his organic garden when he is not on tour, and practices fishing.

Equipment
Guitars
Jackson RR1t
Jackson RR Custom (with "G" inlay on 12th fret)
Jackson RR5
Gibson Explorer (on The Link Alive)

Amplifiers and Cabinets
EVH 5150 III 100 watt HEAD (L'Enfant Sauvage – present)
EVH 5150 III 4×12 Cab (Christian started using EVH in 2009 on Gojira's first headlining tour in US)
Mesa Boogie Dual Rectifier (Terra Incognita – The Link)
Peavey 6505+, 6505, 5150, 5150 II (From Mars to Sirius – The Way of All flesh)

Pedals
Boss TU-2 Chromatic Tuner
MXR Smart-Gate
MXR Carbon Copy Delay
Note: Before the deal with Dunlop, he was using Boss NS-2

Discography

Gojira

Demos 
 Victim (as Godzilla) (1996)
 Possessed (as Godzilla) (1997)
 Saturate (as Godzilla) (1999)
 Wisdom Comes (as Godzilla) (2000)

EPs
 Maciste All'Inferno (Gojira) (2003)
 End of Time (Gojira) (2012)

Studio albums
Terra Incognita (2001)
The Link (2003)
From Mars to Sirius (2005)
The Way of All Flesh (2008)
L'Enfant Sauvage (2012)
Magma (2016)
Fortitude (2021)

With Familha Artús
Òrb (2007)

References

External links

Death metal musicians
French bass guitarists
French heavy metal guitarists
French male guitarists
Living people
People from Bayonne
Progressive metal guitarists
1976 births
Male bass guitarists
21st-century bass guitarists
21st-century French male musicians
Gojira (band) members